The Gnomes' Great Adventure is an American animated film first released, by Miramax Films, in 1987, and directed by Harvey Weinstein. The film was Weinstein's second and final directorial effort, following Playing for Keeps (1986). Based on The World of David the Gnome, it follows the life and adventures of the gnomes as they struggle to outwit enemy trolls.

Despite the film's obscurity, some well known actors contributed to it, including Tom Bosley, Christopher Plummer, Bob Elliott, Ray Goulding and Frank Gorshin. The English soundtrack to the film was rerecorded in 1995 by the London-based company Village Productions, Ltd. with an entirely different voice cast.

Cast

1987 release
 Tom Bosley as David the Gnome (voice)
 Christopher Plummer as Narrator
 Bob Elliott as Fred (voice)
 Ray Goulding as Ed (voice)
 Frank Gorshin as Holler / Carlo / Omar / Prince (voice)
 Tony Randall as Gnome King / Ghost of the Black Lake (voice)

1995 release
 Stephen Bent as Holler / Pat (voice)
 Steve Edwin as Swift (voice)
 Gavin Muir as The Man / The King / Pit (voice)
 Stuart Organ as David (voice)
 Juliet Prague as Tom (voice)
 Regina Reagan as Susan / Twinkle (voice)
 John Vernon as Omar / Master Ghost (voice)
 Claire Woyka as Lisa (voice)

Crew

1987 edition
 Directed by Harvey Weinstein
 Produced by Bob Weinstein
 Screenplay by Shelly Altman and Mike Zettler
 Edited by Ed Glass
 Executive Producer: Claudio Biern Boyd
 Executives in Charge of Production: Micheline Charest and Ronald A. Weinberg
 Associate Producer: Maria Aragon
 Music Composed and Performed by Bob Jewett and Jack Maeby

1995 edition
 Music and Song by Bill Nabb and Terry Wilson
 Production Assistant: Olga Pla
 Production Coordinator: Cristina Nicolau
 Post-Production: Claudio Biern Lliviria and Ray Hampson
 Production Supervisor: Olivia Borricon
 Associate Producer: Jose Manuel Iglesias
 Created for Television by Claudio Biern Boyd

References

External links
 

1987 films
1987 animated films
Film directed by Harvey Weinstein